Face Value was a 1993 play by American playwright David Henry Hwang. It was to be the second Broadway production of the playwright's work, but it closed in previews on March 14, 1993. The production was scheduled to open at the Cort Theatre. It was directed by Jerry Zaks, with B. D. Wong, Jane Krakowski, Mark Linn-Baker, Mia Korf, and Gina Torres in the cast. The play cost $2 million and was one of the biggest lossmakers on Broadway for a play at the time.

Its critical failure provided the inspiration for David Henry Hwang's Obie Award-winning play Yellow Face, which premiered in 2007 at the Mark Taper Forum and moved Off-Broadway to the Joseph Papp Public Theater. The play has never been published, although sections of the text are briefly presented in Yellow Face.

References

External links 
 

Plays by David Henry Hwang
1993 plays